The Rhode Island Department of Revenue (RIDOR) is a state agency of Rhode Island responsible for collection of taxes and distribution of state revenue, as well as administration of state laws governing driver licensing, and motor vehicle sale and registration. The current Director of the Department of Revenue is Guillermo Tello, appointed by Governor Dan McKee on May 4, 2021.

Organization 

 Director of Revenue
 Office of the Director of Revenue
 Deputy Director of Revenue
 Legal Counsel
 Office of Information and Public Relations
 Central Collections Unit (CCU), collects debts owed to the state.
 Division of Motor Vehicles (DMV), issues, suspends, and revokes drives licenses and license plates and regulates automobile safety.
 Adjudication Office
 Division of Municipal Finance (DMF), monitors the financial conditions of cities and towns and provides information to the General Assembly and other policymakers regarding areas of public disclosure, tax levies, and financial reporting.
 Division of Taxation, administers and collects all state taxes and assists taxpayers in understanding and meeting tax requirements.
 Office of Revenue Analysis (ORA), produces monthly reports and assessments on the state's revenue and cash collection to the Office of Management and Budget.
 Rhode Island Lottery

See also 

 Rhode Island General Treasurer
 Rhode Island Department of Administration
 Rhode Island Department of Transportation
 Rhode Island Government

References 

State agencies of Rhode Island
Motor vehicle registration agencies
US state tax agencies
2006 establishments in Rhode Island